The European route E1 in the United Kingdom is a series of roads, part of the International E-road network running completely in the British region of Northern Ireland from Larne, by the capital Belfast to the Irish border at Newry. Eventually the route goes to the Republic of Ireland, Spain and Portugal.

Route 
The E1 starts at the port of Larne following the A8 towards Newtownabbey where it merges with the M2 motorway to Belfast. In the city centre, the route follows the A12 until the M1 motorway. At Lisburn the E1 takes exit 8 to the A1 towards Newry where it crosses the border with the Republic of Ireland changing to the Irish M1 motorway towards the capital Dublin. It has a total distance covered in the United Kingdom of 104 km (65 mi).

Detailed route

References

European routes in the United Kingdom